Clachnacuddin Football Club is a part-time, senior Scottish football club based in the city of Inverness, that currently plays in the Highland Football League.

Clachnacuddin have won the most Highland Football League championships in the competition's history: a total of 18. Their home ground is Grant Street Park in the city's Merkinch area. They also have a youth system, with many teams ranging from the primary squads to the under 19s.

The club operated a reserve team in the North Caledonian Football League but withdrew for the start of the 2014–15 season.

They were founded in 1885 and are nicknamed "The Lilywhites" (due to their white strip) or "Clach". Their name is an English approximation of a Scots Gaelic name meaning "the stone of the tub", referring to a city landmark in Inverness.

As a full member of the Scottish FA, they are entitled to enter the Scottish Cup each year.

Ground
Clachnacuddin have played at Grant Street Park in the Merkinch area of Inverness since the ground opened in 1886. The stadium has a maximum capacity of 3,000 spectators.

On 23 May 1988 a major fire destroyed Grant Street's wooden grandstand with vandalism blamed.

On the morning of Christmas Eve 2019, a fire broke out in the kit room due to an electrical fault in a tumble drier. As a result, Clachnacuddin's home game against Formartine United was called off. Following this incident, Clach were put into a temporary groundshare with Highland RFC at Canal Park, in the Bught area of Inverness.

Honours 
Highland Football League:
Champions: 1894–95, 1896–97, 1897–98, 1900–01, 1902–03, 1903–04, 1904–05, 1905–06, 1907–08, 1911–12, 1920–21, 1921–22, 1922–23, 1923–24, 1938–39, 1947–48, 1974–75, 2003–04

Highland League Cup
Winners: 1947–48, 1950–51, 1981–82, 2003–04, 2013–14

North of Scotland Cup:
Winners: 1894–95, 1895–96, 1897–98, 1899–1900, 1902–03, 1903–04, 1905–06, 1906–07, 1919–20, 1920–21, 1922–23, 1937–38, 1939–40, 1946–47, 1947–48, 1948–49, 1949–50, 1953–54, 1964–65, 1979–80, 1992–93, 2001–02

Inverness Cup:
Winners: 1897–98, 1900–01 1903–04, 1904–05, 1906–07, 1909–10, 1919–20, 1921–22, 1923–24, 1928–29, 1929–30, 1936–37, 1951–52, 1952–53

Scottish Qualifying Cup (North):
Winners: 1934–35, 1938–39, 1947–48, 1973–74, 1974–75, 1998–99

Bells Cup:
Winners: 1977–78

Inverness Charity Cup:
Winners: 1896–97, 1897–98, 1903–04, 1904–05, 1920–21, 1927–28, 1932–33, 1937–38, 1938–39, 1947–48, 1948–49

Elginshire Charity Cup:
Winners: 1896–97, 1897–98, 1899–1900, 1905–06

Inverness Sports Bed Cup:
Winners: 1937–38

Club records
 Record attendance: 8,850 vs St Johnstone, 17 January 1948

References

External links
Website 
Facebook
Twitter

 
Football clubs in Scotland
Highland Football League teams
Association football clubs established in 1885
1885 establishments in Scotland
Football clubs in Inverness